Niyameddin Musayev (born 1 June 1940) is an Azerbaijani pop singer. He graduated from Azerbaijan State Economic University. In 1968 he won the "Mugham-68" award when working as a "Culture Instructor". Starting from 1970 he began working for philharmonic society and in the 1980s he founded the "Röya" music group, which has added to his fame.

Notes

1940 births
Living people
21st-century Azerbaijani male singers
Musicians from Baku
People's Artists of Azerbaijan
Soviet Azerbaijani people
20th-century Azerbaijani male singers